Perry Moss (born July 12, 1969) is an American professional golfer.

Moss was born in Shreveport, Louisiana. He played college golf at Louisiana State University where he won twice and was a two-time All-American. He turned professional in 1991.

Moss played on the Ben Hogan Tour (now Nationwide Tour) in 1992, winning once at the Ben Hogan Texarkana Open. He tied for medalist honors at the 1992 PGA Tour Qualifying Tournament (five-way tie) to earn his PGA Tour card for 1993. He would play both tours through 2002: the Nationwide Tour in 1992, 1994, 1996, 1998, and 2001–02, and the PGA Tour 1993, and 1999–2000, where his best finish was T-3 at the 1999 Southern Farm Bureau Classic. He has played mini-tours since then while dealing with intestinal and hip problems.

Professional wins (2)

Ben Hogan Tour wins (1)

Other wins (1)
1991 Peru Open

Results in major championships

CUT = missed the halfway cut
Note: Moss only played in the U.S. Open.

See also
1992 PGA Tour Qualifying School graduates
1998 PGA Tour Qualifying School graduates

References

External links

American male golfers
LSU Tigers golfers
PGA Tour golfers
Golfers from Shreveport, Louisiana
1969 births
Living people